In computer science and computer programming, system time represents a computer system's notion of the passage of time.  In this sense, time also includes the passing of days on the calendar.

System time is measured by a system clock, which is typically implemented as a simple count of the number of ticks that have transpired since some arbitrary starting date, called the epoch. For example, Unix and POSIX-compliant systems encode system time ("Unix time") as the number of seconds elapsed since the start of the Unix epoch at 1 January 1970 00:00:00 UT, with exceptions for leap seconds.

System time can be converted into calendar time, which is a form more suitable for human comprehension. For example, the Unix system time  seconds since the beginning of the epoch translates into the calendar time 9 September 2001 01:46:40 UT. Library subroutines that handle such conversions may also deal with adjustments for time zones, daylight saving time (DST), leap seconds, and the user's locale settings. Library routines are also generally provided that convert calendar times into system times.

Other time measurements 
Closely related to system time is process time, which is a count of the total CPU time consumed by an executing process. It may be split into user and system CPU time, representing the time spent executing user code and system kernel code, respectively. Process times are a tally of CPU instructions or clock cycles and generally have no direct correlation to wall time.

File systems keep track of the times that files are created, modified, and/or accessed by storing timestamps in the file control block (or inode) of each file and directory.

History 
Most first-generation personal computers did not keep track of dates and times. These included systems that ran the CP/M operating system, as well as early models of the Apple II, the BBC Micro, and the Commodore PET, among others. Add-on peripheral boards that included real-time clock chips with on-board battery back-up were available for the IBM PC and XT, but the IBM AT was the first widely available PC that came equipped with date/time hardware built into the motherboard. Prior to the widespread availability of computer networks, most personal computer systems that did track system time did so only with respect to local time and did not make allowances for different time zones.

With current technology, most modern computers keep track of local civil time, as do many other household and personal devices such as VCRs, DVRs, cable TV receivers, PDAs, pagers, cell phones, fax machines, telephone answering machines, cameras, camcorders, central air conditioners, and microwave ovens.

Microcontrollers operating within embedded systems (such as the Raspberry Pi, Arduino, and other similar systems) do not always have internal hardware to keep track of time. Many such controller systems operate without knowledge of the external time. Those that require such information typically initialize their base time upon rebooting by obtaining the current time from an external source, such as from a time server or external clock, or by prompting the user to manually enter the current time.

Implementation 
The system clock is typically implemented as a programmable interval timer that periodically interrupts the CPU, which then starts executing a timer interrupt service routine. This routine typically adds one tick to the system clock (a simple counter) and handles other periodic housekeeping tasks (preemption, etc.) before returning to the task the CPU was executing before the interruption.

Retrieving system time

The following tables illustrate methods for retrieving the system time in various operating systems, programming languages, and applications. Values marked by (*) are system-dependent and may differ across implementations. All dates are given as Gregorian or proleptic Gregorian calendar dates.

Note that the resolution of an implementation's measurement of time does not imply the same precision of such measurements. For example, a system might return the current time as a value measured in microseconds, but actually be capable of discerning individual clock ticks with a frequency of only 100 Hz (10 ms).

Operating systems

Programming languages and applications

See also

Notes

References

External links
 Critical and Significant Dates, J. R. Stockton (retrieved 3 December 2015) 
 The Boost Date/Time Library (C++)
 The Boost Chrono Library (C++)
 The Chronos Date/Time Library (Smalltalk)
 Joda Time, The Joda Date/Time Library (Java)
 The Perl DateTime Project  (Perl)
 date: Ruby Standard Library Documentation (Ruby)

Operating system technology
Computer programming
Computer real-time clocks